Staraya Melovaya is a rural locality (a selo) and the administrative center of Staromelovatskoye Rural Settlement, Petropavlovsky District, Voronezh Oblast, Russia. The population was 539 as of 2010. There are 19 streets.

Geography 
Staraya Melovaya is located 23 km north of Petropavlovka (the district's administrative centre) by road. Peski is the nearest rural locality.

References 

Rural localities in Petropavlovsky District, Voronezh Oblast